Bahalkeh or Behelkeh may refer to:
 Bahalkeh-ye Bahram Akhund
 Bahalkeh-ye Dashli
 Bahalkeh-ye Nafas
 Bahalkeh-ye Sheykh Musa